Gorni Koriten is a village in Treklyano Municipality, Kyustendil Province, south-western Bulgaria. The village is located between the mountains Kobilskata (peak Chardack - 1312m), Milevskata (peak Milevets - 1733m) and Penkovkata mountain (Konski peak 1187m).

References

Villages in Kyustendil Province